This article features a list of islands sorted by their name beginning with the letter L.

L

See also
List of islands (by country)
List of islands by area
List of islands by population
List of islands by highest point

L